Shirak Beyene (born 20 October 1996 in England) is an Eritrean-English footballer. He is an Eritrea international.

Career

Iceland

Shown the red card on the 59th minute as Huginn fell 0–2 to Magni mid-2011, Beyene had to sit out for the next matchup.

International
He was capped three times for Eritrea in 2013. On the Eritrean internationals going missing after each away game, he stated that the situation was not conducive to football and that the Eritrean National Football Federation would have to start from scratch every time.

References

External links 
 
 2014 Men’s Pro Soccer Combine Roster

Living people
1996 births
Eritrean footballers
Eritrea international footballers
Association football forwards
Eritrean expatriate footballers
Expatriate footballers in Iceland
Association football wingers
London Tigers F.C. players
Íþróttafélagið Huginn players
English people of Eritrean descent
Black British sportspeople
Footballers from Greater London